Roger Bartra Murià (born November 7, 1942 in Mexico City) is a Mexican sociologist and anthropologist, recognized as one of the most important contemporary social scientists of Latin America.

Bartra, son of Spanish Civil War refugee writer Agustí Bartra and Anna Murià, is well known for his work on Mexican identity in The Cage of Melancholy. Identity and Metamorphosis in the Mexican Character, his social theory on The Imaginary Networks of Political Power and, recently, for his anthropo-clinical theory of the “exocerebro” (exo-brain), that argues that the brain is partly constructed by its “cultural prostheses”, external socio-cultural elements that complete it.

Trained as an anthropologist in Mexico, Bartra earned his doctorate in sociology at La Sorbonne and he is an Emeritus Researcher at Mexico´s National Autonomous University, where he has worked since 1971; in 1985 he was awarded the Guggenheim Fellowship. He is also Honorary Research Fellow at the Birkbeck College of the University of London.

Bibliography in English 

 2018. Angels in Mourning: Sublime Madness, Ennui and Melancholy in Modern Thought, Reaktion Books, London.
 2014.  Anthropology of the Brain. Consciousness, Culture and Free Will, Cambridge University Press, United Kingdom.
 2013. The Mexican Transition. Politics, Culture, and Democracy in the Twenty-First Century, Iberian and Latin American Studies series,  University of Wales Press, Cardiff.
 2012. The Imaginary Networks of Political Power. A new revised and expanded edition, La Jaula Abierta/Fondo de Cultura Económica, Mexico.
 2008. Melancholy and Culture: Diseases of the Soul in Golden Age Spain, Iberian and Latin American Studies series, University of Wales Press, Cardiff.
 2002. Blood, Ink, and Culture: Miseries and Splendors of the Post-Mexican Condition, Duke University Press, Durham.
 1997. The Artificial Savage. Modern Myths of the Wild Man, Michigan University Press, Ann Arbor.
 1994. Wild Men in the Looking Glass. The Mythic Origins of European Otherness, Michigan University Press, Ann Arbor.
 1993. Agrarian Structure and Political Power in Mexico, Johns Hopkins University Press, Baltimore.
 1992b. The Cage of Melancholy. Identity and Metamorphosis in the Mexican Character, Rutgers University Press, New Brunswick.
 1992a. The Imaginary Networks of Political Power, Rutgers University Press, New Brunswick.

Notes

References

English:
 Roger Bartra at CCCB
 Interview at Barcelona Metropolis Magazine
 Guadalajara International Book Fair Honors Roger Bartra
 Melancholy and Culture
 

Spanish:
 Roger Bartra at the site of the National Cultural Journalism Homage
 Interview with Roger Bartra on melancholy and culture, Barcelona Metrópolis, 2011.
 Biography at Fractal magazine
 La jaula abierta. Roger Bartra's blog at Letras Libres.

1942 births
Living people
Mexican sociologists
Mexican anthropologists
Mexican male writers
Writers from Mexico City
Mexican people of Catalan descent
National Autonomous University of Mexico alumni